Naveed Obaid (born 28 August 2000) is an Afghan cricketer. He made his first-class debut for Mis Ainak Region in the 2018 Ahmad Shah Abdali 4-day Tournament on 7 March 2018. Prior to his first-class debut, he was part of Afghanistan's squad for the 2016 Under-19 Cricket World Cup.

He made his List A debut for Mis Ainak Region in the 2018 Ghazi Amanullah Khan Regional One Day Tournament on 13 July 2018. He made his Twenty20 debut for Band-e-Amir Dragons in the 2019 Shpageeza Cricket League on 10 October 2019.

References

External links
 

2000 births
Living people
Afghan cricketers
Mis Ainak Knights cricketers
Place of birth missing (living people)